The 1978 Troy State Trojans football team represented Troy State University (now known as Troy University) as a member of the Gulf South Conference (GSC) during the 1978 NCAA Division II football season. Led by third-year head coach Charlie Bradshaw, the Trojans compiled an overall record of 7–2 with a mark of 5–2 in conference play, and finished tied for third in the GSC.

Schedule

References

Troy State
Troy Trojans football seasons
Troy State Trojans football